The American Athletic Conference Men's Basketball Rookie of the Year is a basketball award given to the American Athletic Conference's one or more best men's basketball players in their first year of competitive play. The conference formed in 2013–14 after many schools departed from the original Big East Conference to form their own conference. Austin Nichols of Memphis was the first-ever winner. This award is voted for by the coaches and can only be awarded once to any player.

Key

Winners

Winners by school

References

AAC
Rookie Of The Year
Awards established in 2014